The 21 cm Schnelladekanone Länge 40, abbreviated as 21 cm SK L / 40, was a German naval gun developed in the years before World War I that armed a number of the Imperial German Navy's protected and armored cruisers.  Later spare guns were adapted to railway guns during World War I and later employed as coastal artillery during World War II.

History
The 21 cm SKL/40 was produced in three versions. The C/97 model was the primary turret mounted armament of the Victoria Louise-class protected cruisers. The later C/01 was the primary turret mounted armament of the Prinz Adalbert, Roon and Scharnhorst classes of armored cruisers. The Scharnhorst-class were also armed with four C/04 guns in single casemate mounts amidships.

During the First World War eight guns were removed from the Victoria Louise-class after they were decommissioned in 1914–1915 and these formed two coastal defense batteries of four guns each.  These two batteries named Freya and Hertha were stationed on the Belgian coast during the First World War. Early in the war three of the four armored cruisers of the Prinz Adalbert and Roon classes were lost to mines and submarines and twenty one of their spare guns were transferred to the Imperial German Army for land use.  In 1916 the guns of  also became available after it was decommissioned. In 1917 one of these guns was stationed at Cape Helles in Turkey to arm a coastal artillery unit. Seven other guns were converted to railway guns and they were referred to collectively as the 21 cm SK "Peter Adalbert". During the Second World War these guns were reemployed by coastal artillery units of the Wehrmacht.

Construction
There were three versions of the 21 cm SKL/40. The C/97 version was used on the Victoria Louise class and was constructed of two layers of hoops and a cylindro-prismatic breech block. The C/01 version was designed for twin mounts that were used on the Prinz Adalbert, Roon and Scharnhorst classes had one extra layer of hoops at the rear of the gun.  The C/04 version was similar to the C/01, but was designed for casemate mountings and did not have the extra layer of hoops of the C/01.

Bibliography
 
 http://www.navweaps.com/Weapons/WNGER_827-40_skc95.php

References

Naval guns of Germany
World War I naval weapons
World War I artillery of Germany
World War II artillery of Germany
Coastal artillery
210 mm artillery